Parliamentary elections were held in the Federated States of Micronesia on 3 March 1987 alongside a referendum on having a four-year term of office for all members of Congress. All candidates for seats in Congress ran as independents, whilst the referendum proposal was rejected by voters.

Results

Referendum

By state

References

Micronesia
1987 in the Federated States of Micronesia
Elections in the Federated States of Micronesia
Non-partisan elections
Micronesia
Referendums in the Federated States of Micronesia